The 1928 Saint Louis Billikens football team was an American football team that represented Saint Louis University during the 1928 college football season. In their first season under head coach Hunk Anderson, the Billikens compiled a 4–4–1 record and were outscored by a total of 77 to 52. The team played its home games at Public Schools Stadium and Sportsman's Park in St. Louis.

Schedule

References

Saint Louis
Saint Louis Billikens football seasons
Saint Louis Billikens football